Qoxmuq (also known as, Kokhmukh) is a village and municipality in the Shaki Rayon of Azerbaijan.  It has a population of 4,481.

References 

Populated places in Shaki District